The 2016–17 Robert Morris Colonials women's ice hockey season was the twelfth season of the Robert Morris Colonials women's ice hockey program. The team represented Robert Morris University in the College Hockey America (CHA) conference during the 2016–17 NCAA Division I women's ice hockey season. The 2016–17 Colonials were the CHA regular season champions for first time in program history and won the CHA Tournament for the second time. They also appeared in the NCAA Tournament for the first time, falling to Wisconsin in the opening round.

Offseason
8/22: Morgan Beikirch (Class of 2008) and Ashley Vesci (Class of 2016) were named to the practice squad of the Buffalo Beauts of the NWHL.

Recruiting

Standings

Roster

2016–17 Colonials

Schedule

|-
!colspan=12 style=" "| Regular Season

|-
!colspan=12 style=" "|CHA Tournament

|-
!colspan=12 style=" "|NCAA Tournament

Awards and honors

Jaycee Gephard F, October, 2016 CHA Rookie of the Month 
Brittany Howard F, November, 2016 CHA Player of the Month
Jaycee Gephard F, November, 2016 CHA Rookie of the Month
Brittany Howard F, December, 2016 CHA Player of the Month
Jaycee Gephard F, December, 2016 CHA Rookie of the Month
Jaycee Gephard F, January, 2017 CHA Rookie of the Month
Brittany Howard F, February, 2017 CHA Player of the Month
Jaycee Gephard F, February, 2017 CHA Rookie of the Month
Jaycee Gephard F, February, 2017 Top Rookie in the Nation 
Paul Colontino, CHA Coach of the Year 
Brittany Howard, CHA Player of the Year 
Jaycee Gephard, CHA Rookie of the Year 
Brittany Howard, Forward, CHA First Team All-Star 
Jessica Dodds, Goaltender, CHA First Team All-Star 
Kirsten Welsh, Defender, CHA First Team All-Star 
Jaycee Gephard, Forward, CHA Second Team All-Star 
Jaycee Gephard, Forward, All-CHA Rookie Team

Miscellaneous
 Paul Colontino reached his 100th coaching win on December 31, 2016, against Brown.

References

External links

Robert Morris
Robert Morris Lady Colonials ice hockey seasons
Robert
Robert